Judo is among the sports which was contested at the 2016 South Asian Games. Judo was hosted in Guhwati, India between 10 and 15 February 2019.

Medalists and Medal Table

Men

Women

Medals

References

External links
 
 Official website

2016 South Asian Games
Events at the 2016 South Asian Games
2016
Asian Games, South